Adam Kennedy (born 12 July 1992) is a professional Australian rules footballer playing for the Greater Western Sydney Giants in the Australian Football League (AFL).

He was recruited from the Western Jets in the TAC Cup prior to the 2011 AFL Draft as one of the new club's selections of players who had previously nominated for the draft. Kennedy made his AFL debut in Round 1 of the 2012 AFL season against  in the Giants first ever game. Adam was in the game when gws neafl team won the grand final in 2016

References

External links

1992 births
Living people
Greater Western Sydney Giants players
Australian rules footballers from Victoria (Australia)
Western Jets players